Channel U (marketed as U頻道, formerly named 优频道) is a Singaporean Mandarin-language free-to-air terrestrial television youth teenager channel owned by Mediacorp. It was launched on 6 May 2001 by SPH MediaWorks which ran as Mediacorp's television rival at the time. On New Year's Day (1 January) 2005 at midnight stroke SST, the channel was officially transferred to Mediacorp as national public broadcasting after SPH MediaWorks merged its television assets with the company.

The channel's programming consists of Chinese-language youth teenager music and entertainment produced locally and imported from China, Taiwan, Hong Kong and Thailand as well as Korean-language series provided by KBS, MBC and SBS. Channel U's programming is available subtitled in local languages on optional subtitle tracks and dual-language option (Mandarin and Korean/Thai) is available for Korean-language and Thai language programs.

See also
 TVMobile
 Central
 Okto
 Channel i
 Channel 5
 Channel 8
 CNA
 Suria
 Vasantham
 List of programmes broadcast by Channel U (Singapore)

References

External links
 Official Site

Television channels and stations established in 2001
Mediacorp
SPH MediaWorks
Broadcasting in Singapore
Free-to-air
Television stations in Singapore
Mandarin-language television stations
2001 establishments in Singapore